United Nations Security Council Resolution 229 was adopted on December 2, 1966 after a closed meeting to select the Secretary-General.  The Council, "conscious of the proven qualities of high sense of duty of U Thant, and believing that his reappointment would be most conductive to the larger interests and purposes of the Organization", recommended the appointment of U Thant for another term as Secretary-General.

See also
United Nations Secretary-General selection, 1961#1966 selection
List of United Nations Security Council Resolutions 201 to 300 (1965–1971)

References
Text of the Resolution at undocs.org

External links
 

 0229
 0229
December 1966 events